Rusinów  is a village in Przysucha County, Masovian Voivodeship, in east-central Poland. It is the seat of the gmina (administrative district) called Gmina Rusinów.

References

Villages in Przysucha County
Radom Governorate
Łódź Voivodeship (1919–1939)